Stenocerus longulus is a species of fungus weevil in the beetle family Anthribidae. It is found in Central America, North America, and South America.

References

Further reading

 
 

Anthribidae
Articles created by Qbugbot
Beetles described in 1855